Blandville is an unincorporated community in Doddridge County, West Virginia, United States. Blandville had a post office, which closed on November 9, 2002.

References

Unincorporated communities in Doddridge County, West Virginia
Unincorporated communities in West Virginia